Lidy is the given name or nickname of:

 Lidy Prati (1921–2008), Argentine painter
 Lidy Stoppelman (born 1933), Dutch former figure skater
 Lidy Venneboer (born 1946), Dutch former tennis player

See also
 Liddy
 Liddie

Feminine given names
Hypocorisms